Robert Kurzban is an American freelance writer and former psychology professor specializing in evolutionary psychology.

Kurzban was a tenured professor of psychology at the University of Pennsylvania until 2018, when he resigned following allegations of impropriety. Following his resignation, he was dismissed as the director of the department's honors program. He also resigned as president of the Human Behavior and Evolution Society (HBES) and as Editor-in-Chief of the Society’s journal, Evolution and Human Behavior. He now works as a freelance author and writer.

Kurzban was trained by two pioneers in the field of evolutionary psychology, John Tooby and Leda Cosmides, and his research has focused on evolutionary approaches to understanding human social behavior. He has taken an adaptationist view of human psychology, studying the adaptive function, or, survival value, in the adoption of traits by humans. His work has aimed at understanding the functions of psychological mechanisms occurring in human social life. He has used methods drawn from social psychology, cognitive psychology, and especially experimental economics.

His early work investigated the social construction of race and concerned a hypothesis being proposed at the time, that people "automatically" encode the race of people they observe. Kurzban argued that because humans evolved in a world in which they rarely, if ever, encountered people of significantly different physical appearance from themselves, it was unlikely that the human brain evolved with a mechanism to encode what is currently referred to as "race". A series of experiments showed that with a relatively minor manipulation in the laboratory, the extent to which people categorized others by race could be reduced. He also has done research on cooperation, morality, and mate choice (including speed dating).

Evolutionary psychology has come under attack from a number of critics. Kurzban has been active in defending the discipline from prominent detractors and also has worked to clarify the principle of cognitive modularity, which plays an important role in the discipline.

In 2009, he gave a plenary address at the annual meeting of HBES in Fullerton, California. 

His first book, Why Everyone (Else) Is a Hypocrite: Evolution and the Modular Mind, was published by Princeton University Press in 2010. His second book The Hidden Agenda of the Political Mind: How Self-Interest Shapes Our Opinions and Why We Won’t Admit It, co-authored with Jason Weeden, was published in 2014 also by Princeton University Press.

He was elected president of HBES in 2017.

Selected publications
 with Jason Weeden: The Hidden Agenda of the Political Mind: How Self-Interest Shapes Our Opinions and Why We Won't Admit it. Princeton University Press, Princeton, New Jersey, 2014, .

References

1969 births
Cornell University alumni
Living people
University of California, Santa Barbara alumni
University of California, Los Angeles alumni
University of Arizona faculty
Evolutionary psychologists
Moral psychologists
University of Pennsylvania faculty
People from Poughkeepsie, New York
Human Behavior and Evolution Society